Mouni may refer to:

 Mouní (Μουνί), a modern Greek vulgarity
 Mouni (Burkina Faso town)
 Mouni (film), a 2003 Kannada language film
 Mouni Roy (born 1985), Indian actress

See also
Moonie (disambiguation)
Mooney, a surname